Norb is a newspaper comic strip written by Daniel Pinkwater and illustrated by Tony Auth. Syndicated by King Features Syndicate, it ran for 52 weeks beginning on August 7, 1989 and running until August 4, 1990.

Characters and story
The strip followed the adventures of a scientist named Norb, who travelled the world with his assistants, Jacobowitz, Rat and the dwarf woolly mammoth Eugen. The team confronted curious adversaries, including Tibetan monks from a Los Angeles lamasery, mad disk jockeys and talking fish on an underwater floating island.

Science fiction author Vonda N. McIntyre wrote the introduction for the Norb book collection, published by MU Press.

References

External links
 Norb at Don Markstein's Toonopedia. Archived from the original on March 28, 2016.
Norb (four strips)

American comic strips
Adventure comics
1989 comics debuts
1990 comics endings
Fictional scientists in comics
American comics characters
Comics characters introduced in 1989